The Harlon Hill Trophy is an award in American college football given to the individual selected as the most valuable player in NCAA Division II. The award is named for former University of North Alabama and National Football League player Harlon Hill. It was first given in 1986 to Jeff Bentrim of North Dakota State University. It is often considered to be the Division II equivalent of the Heisman Trophy.

Selection process
Nominations for the trophy are made by sports information directors (SIDs) from the 156 schools that participate in NCAA Division II football. All of the nominees are then presented to a four-member regional Advisory Committee, one for each competition region (Northeast, South, Midwest, and West). Each committee is composed of four SIDs familiar with the process, who select up to six players who they deem worthy of the award, and give their results to the Voting Coordinator.

The 24 players selected in the regional committees are referred to as "Candidates". The regional candidates are then presented to the regions' SIDs, who vote for a first, second, and third place. Each first place vote earns the player three points, while second place votes earn two, and third place votes one point. The top two players selected in each region are the "Finalists" and are placed on a national ballot.

The national ballot is open to all of the SIDs, who vote for first, second, and third place amongst the eight finalists. The top three finishers are invited to the awards presentation held during the Division II Championship weekend on the North Alabama campus in Florence, Alabama. Even though the D-II title game moved to Kansas City, Kansas in 2016, the award ceremony continues to be held in Florence.

Trophy
The football on top is a life-size replica of an actual game football and sits on a solid walnut base. The approximate value of the trophy is $2,300. It was created by Herff Jones of Indianapolis, Indiana, which also makes such notable awards as the Heisman Trophy and the Medal of Honor. Each year's winner of the Hill Trophy is awarded a trophy to keep. The original Hill Trophy remains on display in something or somewhere called 'the Shoals' year-round and bears the names of each year's recipient. The award was first presented in 1986.

Replicas of the Harlon Hill Trophy are on display at:
 The College Football Hall of Fame in Atlanta, Georgia.
 The Alabama Sports Hall of Fame in Birmingham, Alabama.

History
The trophy is named after Harlon Hill, who played at Florence State Teachers College (now the University of North Alabama) from 1950 to 1953, where he was named an NAIA All-American in his senior year. Hill was drafted by the Chicago Bears in the 15th round of the 1954 NFL Draft. He played for the Chicago Bears (1954–61), Pittsburgh Steelers (1962), and Detroit Lions (1962). Hill was the NFL's Rookie of the Year in 1954 and its most valuable player in 1955, both voted by the Newspaper Enterprise Association. He was a three-time All-Pro selection between 1954 and 1956.

Through 2009, only three winners have been selected in the NFL Draft. Three-time winner Johnny Bailey was selected by the Chicago Bears in the ninth round of the 1990 draft. Bailey played six seasons in the NFL and was selected to the 1993 Pro Bowl. Ronald Moore was taken by the Phoenix Cardinals in the fourth round in 1993 and played six seasons. Bernard Scott was selected by the Cincinnati Bengals in the sixth round in 2009 and debuted during his rookie season in 2010.

Others were signed in the NFL as undrafted free agents. Two-time winner Danny Woodhead made his NFL debut with New York Jets in 2009. Ronald McKinnon signed with the Arizona Cardinals, where he played from 1996 to 2004. He played an additional season for the New Orleans Saints for a total of ten seasons in the league, recording over 1,000 tackles.

As of 2009, three winners—Johnny Bailey, Jeff Bentrim, and Ronald McKinnon—have been inducted into the College Football Hall of Fame.

Four players have won the award multiple times: Johnny Bailey in 1987, 1988, and 1989, Dusty Bonner in 2000 and 2001, Danny Woodhead in 2006 and 2007, and Jason Vander Laan in 2014 and 2015. All but one winner (Ronald McKinnon, 1995) have been offensive positions.

Winners

Trophies won by school 
This is a list of the colleges and universities who have had a player win a Hill trophy: Colorado Mines, Texas A&M–Kingsville, Valdosta State, and Ferris State are tied for the most trophies at 3 each. Seven schools have had two different players claim the award—Bloomsburg, Ferris State, North Alabama, North Dakota State, Pittsburg State, and Valdosta State. Texas A&M–Kingsville boasts the only three-time winner, Johnny Bailey. Mines is the only program to have three different winners. In total, players from 20 different schools have won a Harlon Hill, while nine schools have more than one trophy.

†previously known as Texas A&I
§currently an NCAA Division I FCS program

Sponsors
 City of Florence
 Herff-Jones
 Marriott Shoals Hotel & Spa
 OptiNet
 Florence-Lauderdale Tourism

References

External links

College football national player awards
Awards established in 1986
1986 establishments in the United States